Hugues Landon (born 26 June 1930) is a French equestrian. He competed in two events at the 1964 Summer Olympics.

References

1930 births
Living people
French male equestrians
Olympic equestrians of France
Equestrians at the 1964 Summer Olympics
Place of birth missing (living people)